Giovani Samaha (born 14 July 1994) is a Lebanese tennis player.

Career
Samaha has a career high ATP singles ranking of 819 achieved on 19 August 2019 and a career high ATP doubles ranking of 568, achieved on 21 October 2019. Samaha has won 3 ITF Futures doubles title.

Samaha has represented Lebanon at the Davis Cup, where he has a win–loss record of 12–8.

Future and Challenger finals

Singles: 1 (0–1)

Doubles 3 (2–1)

Davis Cup

Participations: (12–8)

   indicates the outcome of the Davis Cup match followed by the score, date, place of event, the zonal classification and its phase, and the court surface.

External links
 
 
 
 Giovani Samaha at Troy University

1994 births
Living people
Lebanese male tennis players
Sportspeople from Beirut
Troy Trojans athletes
Competitors at the 2018 Mediterranean Games
Tennis players at the 2018 Asian Games
Asian Games competitors for Lebanon
Mediterranean Games competitors for Lebanon
College men's tennis players in the United States